Kamla Nagar is a locality in Agra City in Uttar Pradesh, India. It has PIN Code 282004, and is an approved colony.
 The current mayor of Agra(Naveen Jain), also resides in Kamla Nagar. Kamla Nagar is divided into 6 blocks namely A,B,C,D,E and F. Blocks A,B,C comprise Agra municipal corporation ward 81, and blocks D,E,F comprise ward 93. Kamla Nagar is one of the localities in Agra with PNG, or piped natural gas availability, which is provided by Green Gas Limited.

References

Agra
Agra district